Rowan John Tink AM (born 1955) is a former Special Air Service Regiment officer whose identity was widely publicised after he was awarded the United States Bronze Star for his role commanding 150 SASR operators in Afghanistan, notably during Operation Anaconda. The medal was presented to Lieutenant Colonel Tink by Major General Frank Hagenbeck at a farewell ceremony at Bagram on 24 July 2002.

After leaving the ADF, Rowan Tink joined Tenix who were subsequently merged with BAE Systems.

References

External links
Australian SAS in Afghanistan
Portrait, Australian War Memorial (copyright)
Interview transcript, 60 Minutes, ANZAC Day, 25 April 2004
Profile, The Age, ANZAC Day, 25 April 2004

1955 births
Australian Army officers
Living people
Members of the Order of Australia
People educated at Scots College (Sydney)
Royal Military College, Duntroon graduates